Tyrannodoris leonis is a species  of sea slug, a polycerid nudibranch, a marine gastropod mollusc in the family Polyceridae.

Distribution
This species was described from the Galapagos Islands. It is also found in the Eastern Pacific Ocean, from Costa Rica to the Gulf of California.

Description
Tyrannodoris leonis reaches approximately 30 mm in length. Like other nudibranchs in the genus Tyrannodoris, it is carnivorous, feeding on other seaslugs.

References

Polyceridae
Gastropods described in 2005